Trevor Elhi (born 11 April 1993) is an Estonian professional footballer who last played as a left back for Estonian club Nõmme Kalju.

International career
Elhi began his international career with the Estonia under-16 team in 2008, and went on to represent the under-17, under-18, under-19, under-21, and under-23 national sides.

Elhi made his senior international debut for Estonia on 22 November 2016, in a 1–0 away win over Antigua and Barbuda in a friendly.

Honours

Club
Levadia II
Esiliiga: 2009, 2010

Levadia
Estonian Cup: 2011–12

Nõmme Kalju
Meistriliiga: 2018

References

External links

1993 births
Living people
Footballers from Tallinn
Estonian footballers
Association football defenders
Esiliiga players
FCI Levadia U21 players
Meistriliiga players
FCI Levadia Tallinn players
FCI Tallinn players
Nõmme Kalju FC players
First Professional Football League (Bulgaria) players
FC Botev Vratsa players
Estonia youth international footballers
Estonia under-21 international footballers
Estonia international footballers
Estonian expatriate footballers
Expatriate footballers in Bulgaria
Estonian expatriate sportspeople in Bulgaria
Expatriate footballers in Finland
Estonian expatriate sportspeople in Finland